Between Foxrock and a Hard Place is a 2010 play by Paul Howard, as part of the Ross O'Carroll-Kelly series. It had its world premiere on October 15, 2010 at the Olympia Theatre, Dublin produced by Landmark Productions.

The title is a reference to the phrase between a rock and a hard place and the wealthy Dublin suburb Foxrock.

Plot
After falling victim to a tiger kidnapping, Ross and his family must save Foxrock from being replaced with "Sandyford East".

Publicity stunt
A red sports car with cast members was parked outside the Department of the Taoiseach as a publicity stunt. The car blocked an entrance, blocking a car with Taoiseach Brian Cowen from leaving, which led to an official shouting at the occupants of the car to move.

References

2010 plays
Irish plays
Plays set in Ireland